A list of films produced by the Bollywood film industry based in Mumbai in 1935:

A

B-C

D

E-J

K-L

M-N

P-R

S

T-Z

References

External links
 Bollywood films of 1935 at the IMDb

1935
Bollywood
Films, Bollywood